Lawrence Sheldon "Larry" Grossman,  (December 2, 1943 – June 22, 1997) was a politician in Ontario, Canada.  He served in the Legislative Assembly as a Progressive Conservative from 1975 to 1987, and was a cabinet minister in the governments of Bill Davis and Frank Miller.  Grossman was leader of the Ontario Progressive Conservatives from 1985 to 1987.

Background
Born in Toronto, Grossman was the son of Allan Grossman, a former insurance agent who had represented a downtown Toronto riding in the Legislative Assembly of Ontario for twenty years after defeating Ontario's last Communist Member of Provincial Parliament, J. B. Salsberg. Grossman's family was of Polish Jewish origin. He attended Forest Hill Collegiate and went to University of Toronto and the Osgoode Hall Law School. He was admitted to the bar in 1969.

Politics
Grossman's first foray into politics was in the Toronto municipal election of 1972. He competed for alderman in Ward 11, but lost, coming third behind Anne Johnston and David Smith.

When his father retired, Grossman contested and won in the riding of St. Andrew—St. Patrick in the 1975 election, defeating Ontario New Democratic Party candidate Barbara Beardsley by 419 votes.  He was re-elected in the 1977, 1981, and 1985 elections.

After serving as parliamentary assistant to the Attorney General from 1975 to 1977, Grossman was appointed to cabinet on September 21, 1977 as Minister of Consumer and Commercial Relations. On October 18, 1978, Grossman was shuffled to Minister of Industry and Tourism.

Grossman was promoted to the high-profile position of Health Minister on February 18, 1982, and was named Provincial Treasurer and Minister of Economics on July 6, 1983.
In cabinet, Grossman's progressive views earned him a reputation as a Red Tory, and he clashed with his own party after then-Health Minister Frank Miller closed the Kensington Hospital in Grossman's riding.

Cabinet posts

Leadership
When Davis announced his resignation as leader of the party and premier of the province, Grossman ran to succeed him.  He was widely regarded as the most progressive candidate, and was endorsed by members of the party's Toronto-based Big Blue Machine.  His supporters included Susan Fish, Russ Ramsay, Phil Gillies, Bruce McCaffrey and George Taylor.  However, delegates to the party's January 1985 leadership convention chose the more conservative Frank Miller as leader.  Grossman placed third on the first ballot, ahead of Roy McMurtry, but behind Miller and Dennis Timbrell. With the support of the McMurtry campaign, Grossman moved six votes ahead of Timbrell on the second ballot. It was confirmed in 1987 by Dr. John Balkwill that the Miller campaign did not want the prospect of facing Timbrell on the final ballot, since their tracking of delegate intentions showed that their candidate would lose decisively to Timbrell, so about 30-40 Miller delegates voted strategically for Grossman to ensure Timbrell's elimination.

Timbrell, who was a bitter rival of Grossman but also wanted to prevent a Miller victory, reluctantly endorsed Grossman after the results were confirmed by a recount.  He did not bring enough delegates on the third ballot, however, and Grossman lost to Miller.  Grossman remained the Provincial Treasurer in Miller's government.

Miller ran a disastrous campaign in the 1985 election, and the party was reduced to a fragile minority government.  Grossman was appointed as Minister of Education and Minister of Colleges and Universities after the election, but was unable to accomplish anything of significance before the Liberals and New Democrats joined forces to topple Miller's government in the legislature.

Miller quickly resigned as leader, and Grossman was chosen as the new leader over Dennis Timbrell and Alan Pope at a second leadership convention on November 16, 1985. Pope was forced on the defensive when one of his workers was caught polling party members as to whether religion would make a difference in the leadership race, which was seen as a reference to Grossman's Jewish background. Timbrell lost support when he declared his opposition to the full funding of Catholic schools, causing Norm Sterling to defect to Grossman's campaign. Grossman defeated Timbrell by only 19 votes on the second ballot, in a campaign that was marked by considerable acrimony.

Grossman became Leader of the Opposition to the Liberal Premier David Peterson.

Grossman's political hero was Benjamin Disraeli, whose portrait was displayed on his office wall.  Shortly after winning the leadership of the Ontario Progressive Conservatives, he criticized American "neo-Conservatism" as "a shallow reconstitution of laissez-faire liberalism."

Opposition
The Peterson government was very popular, and Grossman's Tories, in opposition for the first time since 1943, had a difficult time adjusting to their new role. When the Liberals called an early election for the fall of 1987, Grossman's Tories tried to campaign on a right-wing platform of tax cuts and reduced government spending.  Grossman's history as a Red Tory made for a poor contrast with the party's new platform. Peterson won a strong majority government in the 1987 election, and the Conservatives were reduced from 52 seats to 16, falling to third place behind the NDP—their worst showing in over half a century.  Grossman lost his own seat to Liberal challenger Ron Kanter and promptly resigned. The party selected Andy Brandt as interim leader.

Retirement and last years
He assisted new party leader Mike Harris in the 1990 provincial election, and coached him to stay "on-message" with the issue of tax cuts.

In 1997, Larry Grossman died at the age of 53 from brain cancer. A few days before his death, he invited TVOntario cameras into his house to help with TVO's membership campaign. He was named to the Order of Ontario shortly before his death. He left behind his three children Melissa, Jaimie and Robbie. He was divorced from Carole, their mother, at the time of his death.

In 2004, the Forest Hill Arena, a local Toronto hockey and skating rink where his children played, was renamed the Larry Grossman Forest Hill Memorial Arena in his honour.

References

Notes

Citations

Further reading
 Colombo, John Robert. Hall of Fame & Obituaries : The 1998 Canadian Global Almanac, 1998. .

External links
 

1943 births
1997 deaths
Canadian people of Polish-Jewish descent
Finance ministers of Ontario
Leaders of the Progressive Conservative Party of Ontario
Jewish Canadian politicians
Members of the Order of Ontario
Deaths from brain tumor
Deaths from cancer in Ontario
Neurological disease deaths in Ontario
Politicians from Toronto